Prospect Hill Cemetery is a cemetery in Brattleboro, Vermont. Founded in 1796, it was originally known as the Village Burying Ground, and then Old Village Burying Ground. Additional parcels land was acquired over time, up to 1869.

The cemetery includes a number of notable figures from the history of the town. Included in the graves at the site, are those of 19 union soldiers who died at the military hospital in the town during the Civil War.

Notable burials
 James Elliot (1775–1839), member of the United States House of Representatives
 James Fisk (1835–1872), financier and businessman
 Broughton Harris (1822–1899), public official and businessman
 Kittredge Haskins (1836–1916), member of the United States House of Representatives
 Frederick Holbrook (1813–1909), governor of Vermont
 George W. Hooker (1838–1902), American Civil War recipient of the Medal of Honor
 Jonathan Hunt (1787–1832), member of the United States House of Representatives
 William Morris Hunt (1824–1879), Boston-based painter
 James Manning Tyler (1835–1926), member of the United States House of Representatives
 Royall Tyler (1757–1826), public official and author

References

External links 
 
  

Brattleboro, Vermont
Cemeteries in Vermont